Anwar Adnan Saleh (born 1948) is a former Governor of West Sulawesi, Indonesia. He was inaugurated in 2006.

References 

1948 births
Living people
Governors of West Sulawesi
People from South Sulawesi
Golkar politicians